XHBUAP-FM is a radio station serving Puebla, Puebla owned by the Benemérita Universidad Autónoma de Puebla. It is branded as Radio BUAP and broadcasts on 96.9 FM from its campus.

History
Efforts by the BUAP to build a radio station date to 1965 but met with much resistance. XHBUAP-FM did not receive its permit until August 1997.

In 2011, XHBUAP received permits to expand its signal to Chignahuapan (XHCHP-FM 104.3, 3 kW) and Tehuacán (XHTEE-FM 93.9, 3 kW). These stations take some programs from Puebla but also have their own program schedules.

References

Radio stations in Puebla
Mass media in Puebla (city)
University radio stations in Mexico